Percey is a commune in the Yonne department in Bourgogne-Franche-Comté in north-central France.

It lies on the Canal de Bourgogne, with the Route départementale (D945), named locally «Rue Nationale» running through it, between Saint-Florentin and Tonnerre.

Percey is the main village of the commune of Percey. Other villages are: Les Milleries and La Sogne.

The Château de Percey and the farm, church and old coach-house still exist. There is a garage, Gites (holiday rental homes in the Château), a small restaurant/hotel, school, and a garden centre (November-2006). The car-sales garage closed down in 2011.

ADSL is available there (as of 2012 2Mbs maximum), and the Chateau hosts a free wireless hotspot, as does the town hall (since 2008).

A catering company 'Becart' is moving in 2012 from nearby Saint Florentin to the old car-sales building in Percey.

See also
Communes of the Yonne department

References

Communes of Yonne